Pfaffroda is a village and a former municipality in the district Erzgebirgskreis, in Saxony, Germany. Since 1 January 2017, it is part of the town Olbernhau.

References 

Erzgebirgskreis
Former municipalities in Saxony